Ahmad Donyamali is an Iranian politician.

He was formerly chairman of Ports and Maritime Organization of Iran and president of Canoeing, Rowing & Sailing Federation.

Donyamali, along with fellow councillor Elaheh Rastgou, entered the council endorsed by the reformist list but crossed the floor to vote in favor of the conservative Mehdi Chamran.

References

 Biography
 Résumé

Living people
Tehran Councillors 2013–2017
Islamic Azad University alumni
Islamic Revolutionary Guard Corps personnel of the Iran–Iraq War
People from Bandar-e Anzali
Iranian sports executives and administrators
Iranian politicians who have crossed the floor
1960 births